The Deep Blue Sea is a 2011 British romantic drama film written and directed by Terence Davies and starring Rachel Weisz, Tom Hiddleston, and Simon Russell Beale. It is an adaptation of the 1952 Terence Rattigan play The Deep Blue Sea about the wife of a judge who engages in an affair with a former RAF pilot. This film version was funded by the UK Film Council and Film4, produced by Sean O'Connor and Kate Ogborn.

Filming began in late 2010 and it was released in the United Kingdom in 2011, the year of Rattigan's centenary. It was released in the United States in 2012 by distributor Music Box Films.

Plot
In 1950, Hester Collyer, the younger wife of High Court judge Sir William Collyer, has embarked on a passionate affair with Freddie Page, a handsome young former RAF pilot troubled by his memories of the Second World War. Freddie throws Hester's life in turmoil, as their erotic relationship leaves her emotionally stranded and physically isolated. For Freddie, the tumultuous wartime mix of fear and excitement that was once in his life seems to be no longer present.

Most of the film takes place during one day in Hester's flat, a day on which she has decided to commit suicide. Her suicide attempt fails and as she recovers, the story of her affair and her married life is played out in a mosaic of short and sporadic flashbacks. We soon discover the constraints of Hester's comfortable marriage, which is affectionate but without sexual passion.

As Hester's affair is discovered she leaves her life of comparative luxury and moves into a dingy London flat with Freddie. Hester's new lover has awakened her sexuality, but the reckless, thrill-seeking Freddie can never give her the love and stability that her husband gave her. Yet to return to a life without passion would be unbearable for her. The film takes its title from her dilemma of being caught between the devil and the deep blue sea – two equally undesirable situations.

Cast
 Rachel Weisz as Hester Collyer
 Tom Hiddleston as Freddie Page
 Simon Russell Beale as Sir William Collyer
 Harry Hadden-Paton as Jackie Jackson
 Ann Mitchell as Mrs Elton
 Sarah Kants as Liz Jackson
 Karl Johnson as Mr. Miller
 Barbara Jefford as Collyer's mother
 Oliver Ford Davies as Hester's father

Production
Filming locations are in Buckinghamshire and London including the 3 Mills Studios in Bow.

The background music is taken from Samuel Barber's violin concerto written 1939.

Critical reception
The film was released to strongly positive reviews from critics. At Rotten Tomatoes, the film holds a rating of 80%, based on 141 reviews and an average rating of 7.11/10. It also has a score of 82 on Metacritic based on 30 reviews.

For her performance, Weisz won the Best Actress Award at the 2012 New York Film Critics Circle Awards and also won the Best Actress Award from the Toronto Film Critics Association in the same year.

In January 2012, Weisz was nominated as Best Actress in the 70th Golden Globe Awards. The film was also chosen as one of the Top Ten films of the year by The New York Times and The Los Angeles Times. The film has found a largely appreciative audience and critical success in the United States with Weisz's performance named as 'film performance of 2012' by David Edelstein of New York magazine.

Accolades

References

External links
 
 
 
 

2011 films
2011 romantic drama films
2010s historical romance films
British romantic drama films
Films directed by Terence Davies
British films based on plays
Film4 Productions films
Films based on works by Terence Rattigan
Films set in 1950
Films set in London
Films shot in London
2010s English-language films
2010s British films